Ivica Šola (born 1968) is a Croatian theologian, communication scientist, columnist and university professor.

Šola was born in 1968 in Đakovo. He received a bachelor's degree from University of Zagreb in 1994, a master's degree from Pontifical Lateran University in Rome (philosophy of Martin Buber) in 1998, and a doctoral degree in 2012 in Zagreb with a dissertation titled "Ethical aspects of philosophy of Luigi Pareyson: truth, ontos and freedom".

Šola is an assistant professor at the Academy of Arts, University of Osijek, where he teaches courses in ethics, religion, culture and media theory. His main fields of scientific interest are interdisciplinary topics of philosophy, religion, culture, media, and society.

He writes columns for Glas Slavonije ("Outsider's Notes"), Večernji list, Slobodna Dalmacija ("Agora"), Globus and others.

References

External links 
 Author's page with list of published columns in Slobodna Dalmacija
 Academy of Arts and Culture in Osijek

Living people
1968 births
People from Đakovo
Croatian theologians
Croatian columnists
University of Zagreb alumni